Jafarabad-e Olya (also Romanized as  Ja‘farābād-e ‘Olyā; also known as Ja‘farābād) is a village in Kakavand-e Sharqi Rural District, Kakavand District, Delfan County, Lorestan Province, Iran. At the 2006 census, its population was 90, in 22 families.

References 

Towns and villages in Delfan County